Novogagatli is a rural locality (a selo) in Khasavyurtovsky District, Republic of Dagestan, Russia. The population was 4,782 as of 2010. There are 72 streets.

Geography 
Novogagatli is located 35 km north of Khasavyurt (the district's administrative centre) by road. Novoselskoye is the nearest rural locality.

References 

Rural localities in Khasavyurtovsky District